Hera Desi Ana Rachmawati or simply Hera Desi (born 2 December 1992) is an Indonesian badminton player.

Achievements

BWF Grand Prix 
The BWF Grand Prix had two levels, the Grand Prix and Grand Prix Gold. It was a series of badminton tournaments sanctioned by the Badminton World Federation (BWF) and played between 2007 and 2017.

Women's singles

  BWF Grand Prix Gold tournament
  BWF Grand Prix tournament

BWF International Challenge/Series 
Women's singles

  BWF International Challenge tournament
  BWF International Series tournament

References 

1992 births
Living people
People from Purworejo Regency
Sportspeople from Central Java
Indonesian female badminton players
Universiade gold medalists for Indonesia
Universiade medalists in badminton
Medalists at the 2011 Summer Universiade
21st-century Indonesian women
20th-century Indonesian women